The Walloons is a comedy play by the British writer Richard Cumberland. It was first staged at the Covent Garden Theatre in April 1782. The character of Father O'Sullivan was widely believed to be based on Father Thomas Hussey an Irish-born Priest with whom Cumberland conducted secret talks in an attempt to secure a peace agreement between Britain and Spain during the American War of Independence.

References

Bibliography
 Mudford, William. The Life of Richard Cumberland. Sherwood, Neely & Jones, 1812.
 Nicoll, Allardyce. A History of English Drama 1660-1900. Volume III: Late Eighteenth Century Drama. Cambridge University Press, 1952.

Plays by Richard Cumberland
1782 plays